State Road 197 (NM 197) is a  state highway in the US state of New Mexico.  NM 197's southern terminus is at the end of state maintenance at the Sandoval–McKinley county line, and the northern terminus is at U.S. Route 550 (US 550) in Cuba.

Major intersections

See also

References

197
Transportation in Sandoval County, New Mexico